Jyväskylä Sinfonia is an orchestra in Finland. Its current music director is Ville Matvejeff. Jyväskylä Sinfonia was the first to record Einojuhani Rautavaara's Aleksis Kivi. Their first recording for Naxos Records was the first-five numbered symphonies by Joseph Haydn. The orchestra accompanied baritone Waltteri Torikka on his platinum-selling debut album Sydän.

References

External links
 Official website in English

Finnish orchestras